Basically Black is a 1973 Australian television comedy program, notable as the first television program written and created by Indigenous Australians. It was produced as one of a series of pilot programs called The Comedy Game.

A single half-hour of sketch comedy, the program was based on a satirical political revue of the same name by the National Black Theatre that had been performed at the Nimrod Theatre in Sydney the previous year.

It premiered on 7 July 1973 as part of a series of ABC Television comedy pilots, The Comedy Game. Some elements of the original script had been censored by Australian Broadcasting Corporation, and it was described by Gary Foley as a "politically watered-down" version of the stage show.

The pilot was deemed a success, but the ABC did not proceed with creating a series from it.

See also
Black Comedy

References

External links
 (28 mins)

Australian Broadcasting Corporation original programming
Australian comedy television series
1973 Australian television series debuts
1973 Australian television series endings
Indigenous Australian television series